"Perfect Weapon" is the second single by American rock band, Black Veil Brides, from their debut album We Stitch These Wounds, officially released on June 8, 2010.
The song was written by Andy Six before the first departure breakdown of the band.
This is the last single to include drummer Sandra Alvarenga before her departure from the band.

On September 22, 2011 "Perfect Weapon" was released as a downloadable song on the Rock Band Network.

Music video
The video begins by showing the members of the band fixing their stage makeup and costumes. After all are ready, Andy Six is shown smoking and exhaling. The view changes to show Six stitching a wound on his mouth in the mirror with the other members behind him. The track "The Outcasts (Call to Arms)" is heard, with the image of the skeleton of a virgin, then the song begins. In the penultimate choir, a group of children behind them shouting "Go!" with Six, then all the children make a detour to the band, on having ended one sees Six kneeling down and praying, and between the children there appears David Sasik, the young actor who appeared in the "Knives and Pens" music video.

Track listing
CD single

Personnel
Black Veil Brides
 Andy Six – lead vocals  
 Jake Pitts – lead guitar
 Jinxx – rhythm guitar
 Ashley Purdy – bass, backing vocals 
 Sandra Alvarenga – drums, percussion

Production
 Produced by Don DeBiase
 Engineered by Johnny Burke
 Directed by Patrick Fogarty

References

External links
Perfect Weapon on BVB's Channel

  
    
2010 singles
2010 songs
Black Veil Brides songs